The Chrysler M Platform (or "M-Body") was an intermediate-sized automobile platform used by Chrysler motors from   1977 to 1989.  It was a successor to the F-body, as used on the Dodge Aspen/ Plymouth Volare. The M-body was also the successor to the short-lived R-body, as the Chrysler New Yorker and Plymouth Gran Fury moved to it following the R-body's demise in 1981. The M platform was the final production passenger car with a solid rear axle mounted on Hotchkiss-style, parallel semi-elliptical leaf springs sold in the U.S.

The M-cars were built at St. Louis, Missouri and Newark, Delaware with initial debut (LeBaron/Diplomat series) in spring 1977 as 1977 1/2 models, with production shifting to Windsor, Ontario through 1983, then moving to Fenton, MO. Beginning in February 1987 and ending with 1989 model year, the American Motors Main plant in Kenosha, Wisconsin was utilized for assembly.

By 1983–84, it became clear that most private buyers preferred the equally roomy but cheaper and more fuel-efficient K-cars; however, the M's long-proven traditional engineering, handling, and V8 engine availability appealed to police and taxi fleets, allowing the car's continued existence until the end of the decade.
In mid-1988, the Chrysler M-bodies received a driver side air bag.
After the M-bodies were discontinued in mid-1989, Chrysler Corporation didn't build a rear wheel drive car outside of trucks and specialty models until LX based cars.

Vehicles on this platform include:
 1977-1989 Dodge Diplomat
 1977-1981 Chrysler LeBaron
 1978-1981 Chrysler Town & Country station wagon
 1978-1979 Dodge Coronet (South America)
 1978-1982 Plymouth Caravelle (Canada)
 1980-1981 Dodge Dart (Mexico)
 1981-1982 Dodge Magnum 5.9L (Mexico)
 1982-1989 Plymouth Gran Fury
 1982 Chrysler New Yorker
 1983 Chrysler New Yorker Fifth Avenue
 1983-1989 Plymouth Caravelle Salon (Canada)
 1984-1989 Chrysler Fifth Avenue
1979-1980 Monteverdi Sierra Convertible  
Three body styles offered:
 2-door coupe - 1977-1981
 4-door sedan - 1977-1989
 4-door station wagon - 1978-1981

Two wheelbases used:
 108.7 in - 1980-1981 2-door 
 112.7 in - 1977-1979 2-door, 1978-1981 Station Wagon  and 1977-1989 4-door 

Engines used with this platform include:
 225 Slant 6 (1977-1983)
 318 V8 (1977-1989)
 360 V8 (1977-1979)

See also
 List of Chrysler platforms

References
Inline

General
http://www.allpar.com
https://www.allpar.com/threads/dodge-diplomat-plymouth-gran-fury-caravelle-and-chrysler-lebaron-new-yorker-and-fifth.228725/#post-1085222823 (By Ed Hennessy and by Frank Billington)
http://www.allpar.com/model/rwdbodies.html (Mopar Body Types By  Ed Hennessy Date 1998)
https://gazeo.com/automotive/vehicles/Chrysler-M-body-LPG-blast-from-the-past,article,6712.html (Chrysler M-body LPG - Blast from the Past By Robert Markowski Date 2-13-2013  )
http://www.angelfire.com/ca/mikesspot/history.html
http://www.policecarwebsite.net/policepackage/mbody.html
http://blog.consumerguide.com/goodbye-gran-fifthlomat-the-chrysler-m-body-cars-of-1989/ (Goodbye Gran Fifthlomat: The Chrysler M-Body Cars of 1989 By Tom Appel Date 4-29-2014)

M